Borj-e Moaz (also Romanized as  Borj-e Mo‘āz, Borj Moāz, and Borj-e Ma‘āz̄; also known as Borj-e Sardār) is a village in Fahraj Rural District, in the Central District of Fahraj County, Kerman Province, Iran. At the 2006 census, its population was 1,302, in 321 families.

References 

Populated places in Fahraj County